Fort Crook may refer to two U.S. military posts, both named after Gen. George Crook:
Fort Crook (California) (1857-1869), near Fall River Mills, California
Fort Crook, Nebraska (1891-1946), near Omaha, Nebraska, now Offutt Air Force Base